Roberta Bonatti (born 5 July 1997) is an Italian female boxer, athlete of the Centro Sportivo Carabinieri.

Biography
Bonatti won two medals at the international amateur European level, at the EU Amateur Championships (2016) and European Championships (2019).

References

External links
 

1997 births
Living people
Italian women boxers
Boxers of Centro Sportivo Carabinieri
Light-flyweight boxers
Competitors at the 2022 Mediterranean Games
20th-century Italian women
21st-century Italian women
Mediterranean Games competitors for Italy